Cyril Alan Kent (28 August 1907 – 23 April 1968) was an Australian rules footballer who played with Collingwood in the Victorian Football League (VFL).

Notes

External links 

Cyril Kent's profile at Collingwood Forever

1907 births
1968 deaths
Australian rules footballers from Victoria (Australia)
Collingwood Football Club players